The Virgin Queen is a 1928 MGM silent fictionalized film short in two-color Technicolor. It was the third short film produced as part of Metro-Goldwyn-Mayer's "Great Events" series.

Plot summary

Cast
 Forrest Stanley as Sir Walter Ralegh
 Dorothy Dwan as Bess Throckmorton - Lady-in-Waiting
 Aileen Manning as Queen Elizabeth
 Armand Kaliz

Production
The film was shot over five days at the Tec-Art Studio in Hollywood. The $21,000 budget made it one of the more "higher priced productions" in the "Great Events" series.

Preservation Status
No complete prints of The Virgin Queen were known to exist as of 2015, but 600 ft from the film's first reel was preserved in 2014 by the George Eastman House.

See also
 The Virgin Queen (1955 film)

References

External links 
 

1928 films
American silent short films
Metro-Goldwyn-Mayer short films
Silent films in color
American biographical films
Films about Elizabeth I
Cultural depictions of Walter Raleigh
Films set in Tudor England
1920s American films